Bertha Raffetto (March 15, 1885 – September 6, 1952) is best known for her song, "Home Means Nevada", which is the official state song for Nevada.

Biography
Bertha Eaton was born in Bloomfield, Iowa, March 15, 1885. She was the daughter of Enoch Henry and Susan Frances Walker Eaton.

During the 1930s, Raffetto had a poetry column in the Nevada State Journal that was a popular feature. During the summer of 1932, the Nevada Native Daughters invited her to sing a Nevada song of her choice at their annual picnic in August of that year. She recalled that years earlier she had attempted to write a song about Nevada, but had set it aside. Raffetto assembled her earlier notes and reworked the song the day before she was to give her performance. The following afternoon she sang her song "Home Means Nevada" from her hand written script. In the audience was former Nevada governor Roswell K. Colcord who told her afterwards, "Honey, that's the prettiest Nevada song that I have ever heard. It should be made the State Song of Nevada!" 

She married  Henry Clyde Hough, whom she later divorced. Later she married her Reno divorce attorney, Fiore Raffetto.

References

1885 births
1952 deaths
Songwriters from Iowa
People from Bloomfield, Iowa